The 15th British Academy Film Awards, given by the British Academy of Film and Television Arts in 1962, honoured the best films of 1961.

Winners and nominees

Best Film
Ballad of a Soldier (TIE) The Hustler (TIE) Apur Sansar
 The Hole
 The Innocents
 Judgment at Nuremberg
 The Long and the Short and the Tall
 Rocco and His Brothers
 The Sundowners
 A Taste of Honey
 Whistle Down the Wind

Best British FilmA Taste of Honey
 The Innocents
 The Long and the Short and the Tall
 The Sundowners
 Whistle Down the Wind

Best British Actor
Peter Finch in No Love for Johnnie
 Dirk Bogarde in Victim

Best Foreign Actor
Paul Newman in The Hustler
 Montgomery Clift in Judgment at Nuremberg
 Vladimir Ivashov in Ballad of a Soldier
 Philippe Leroy in The Hole
 Sidney Poitier in A Raisin in the Sun
 Maximilian Schell in Judgment at Nuremberg
 Alberto Sordi in The Best of Enemies

Best British Actress
Dora Bryan in A Taste of Honey
 Deborah Kerr in The Sundowners
 Hayley Mills in Whistle Down the Wind

Best Foreign Actress
Sophia Loren in Two Women
 Annie Girardot in Rocco and His Brothers
 Piper Laurie in The Hustler
 Claudia McNeil in A Raisin in the Sun
 Jean Seberg in Breathless

Best British Screenplay
The Day the Earth Caught Fire – Wolf Mankowitz and Val Guest (TIE) A Taste of Honey – Tony Richardson and Shelagh Delaney (TIE) Flame in the Streets – Ted Willis
 The Guns of Navarone – Carl Foreman
 Victim – Janet Green and John McCormick
 Whistle Down the Wind – Keith Waterhouse and Willis Hall

Best Animated FilmOne Hundred and One Dalmatians
 The Do-It-Yourself Cartoon Kit
 For Better...For Worse

Best Short Film
Terminus – John Schlesinger Eyes of a Child
 Let My People Go

United Nations AwardLet My People Go
 The Best of Enemies
 Take a Giant Step

Most Promising Newcomer to Leading Film Roles
Rita Tushingham in A Taste of Honey
 Anthony Hancock in The Rebel
 Murray Melvin in A Taste of Honey

References

External links
 

Film015
British Academy Film Awards
British Academy Film Awards